Frank Becker is a former West German slalom canoeist who competed in the 1980s and the 1990s. He won a bronze medal in the C-2 team event at the 1989 ICF Canoe Slalom World Championships in Savage River.

References

German male canoeists
Living people
Year of birth missing (living people)
Medalists at the ICF Canoe Slalom World Championships